Hatzeva is a moshav in southern Israel. Located in the Arava, 12 km north of Ein Yahav, it falls under the jurisdiction of Central Arava Regional Council.

History

Antiquity
Hatzeva was a fort and caravanserai established beside Ein Hatzeva, a rare water source in the region. It is identified with the biblical site Tamar (1 Kings 9:17-18). According to the Bible, it was a Judean fort, but Edomite idols were also discovered there, now on display at the Israel Museum. In the Nabatean period, Hatzeva was a caravanserai along the northern path of the incense route. Later it became  a Roman fort, part of the Roman southern security zone (The ‘Limes’). The Roman Scorpion Ascent that connects  Hazteva and Mamshit is believed to date from that time. The site was excavated in the 1980s and yielded finds in six stratified layers.

State of Israel
Hatzeva was founded in 1965 as a Nahal settlement near the Arava Road and became a moshav in 1968. It was named after the nearby Hatzeva Fortress. In 1971 its location changed slightly. Near the moshav's access road lies the Hatzeva field school (Gidron), located where the moshav was until 1971. Hashomer Hachadash is a grassroots movement in Hatzeva established to help Israeli farmers and ranchers safeguard their land.

References

Central Arava Regional Council
Moshavim
Nahal settlements
Populated places in Southern District (Israel)
Populated places established in 1968
1968 establishments in Israel